Nebria angusticollis microcephala is a subspecies of ground beetle in the Nebriinae subfamily that can be found in the Alps of France, Italy, and Switzerland.

References

angusticollis microcephala
Beetles described in 1891
Beetles of Europe